Robert Groom may refer to:

 Bob Groom (1884–1948), baseball pitcher
 Robert Groom (cricketer) (1816–1891), English cricketer
 Robert W. Groom, member of the 1860–61 California State Assembly